Henry Gabriel Cisneros (born June 11, 1947) is an American politician and businessman. He served as the mayor of San Antonio, Texas, from 1981 to 1989, the second Latino mayor of a major American city and the city's first since 1842 (when Juan Seguín was forced out of office). A Democrat, Cisneros served as the 10th Secretary of Housing and Urban Development (HUD) in the administration of President Bill Clinton from 1993 to 1997. As HUD Secretary, Cisneros was credited with initiating the revitalization of many public housing developments and with formulating policies that contributed to achieving the nation's highest ever rate of home ownership.  In his role as the President's chief representative to the cities, Cisneros personally worked in more than two hundred cities spread over all fifty states. Cisneros's decision to leave the HUD position and not serve a second term was overshadowed by controversy involving payments to his former mistress.

Prior to his Cabinet position, Cisneros served four terms as the mayor of his hometown of San Antonio, from 1981 to 1989. As mayor, Cisneros worked to rebuild the city's economic base, recruited convention business, attracted high tech industries, increased the level of tourism, and worked to bring more jobs to San Antonio. Before his tenure as mayor, Cisneros was elected to three two-year terms on the city council, on which he served from 1975 to 1981.

Throughout his career in politics and business, Cisneros has remained actively involved with housing development and urban revitalization. Cisneros is also an active advocate for the Latino community.  He has and continues to serve on corporate boards, as well as chairing and serving on several non-profit boards to promote Latinos and the immigrant population. Cisneros has authored, edited, or collaborated on several books and is an in-demand public speaker.

After public office, Cisneros served as President and COO for the Spanish-language network Univision from 1997 to 2000 before forming American City Vista to work the nation's leading homebuilders to create homes priced within the range of average families.  That company evolved to become CityView where Cisneros is Chairman. He is a partner in the minority owned investment banking firm Siebert Cisneros Shank & Co.

Cisneros co-chairs the Bipartisan Policy Center's Housing Commission and Immigration Task Force.

Personal background
The eldest child of George and Elvira (née Munguia) Cisneros, Henry Gabriel Cisneros was born in San Antonio, Texas, in a neighborhood that bordered the city's predominantly Mexican west side barrio (now the city's inner west side). Cisneros was named after his mother's youngest brother who developed Hodgkin's disease at the age of 14 and asked from his deathbed that his sister give his name to her son. He is descended on his father's side from early Spanish settlers in New Mexico.  His mother was the daughter of Rómulo Munguía, a relatively wealthy and well connected Mexican printer and intellectual, and Carolina Malpica Munguía, an educator, radio host, and community activist, who chose to leave Mexico in 1926 after the leftist Mexican Revolution and Cristero War

Cisneros's father, who came from a family of small farmers who had settled in Colorado after losing their Spanish land grant during the Great Depression was a federal civil servant and later an Army colonel who met Elvira Munguia while he was stationed in San Antonio. As his parents survived great adversity and advanced through life with an unfailing belief in hard work, education merit leading to a better life, Cisneros along with his two brothers and two sisters were raised in a highly structured environment that put emphasis on scholarly studies and the arts.

Cisneros received a Catholic school education, first at the Church of the Little Flower, followed by attendance at Central Catholic Marianist High School in San Antonio. He entered Texas A&M University in 1964 and quickly became a student leader with the MSC Student Conference on National Affairs. In his sophomore year, he switched his major from aeronautical engineering to city management. In 1967, through MSC SCONA, Cisneros was selected to attend the annual Student Conference on United States Affairs at West Point where he first learned that U.S. cities were in serious trouble. Relating what he heard to the problems of his largely poor hometown, the meeting, plus a visit to New York City, was a personal and professional turning point for him.

Graduating from A&M with a Bachelor of Arts in English in 1968, he went on to earn a Master of Arts in Urban and Regional Planning in 1970 from A&M as well. He earned an additional Master's in Public Administration from the John F. Kennedy School of Government at Harvard University in 1973, studied urban economics and did doctoral research at the Massachusetts Institute of Technology in 1974, and received a Doctor of Public Administration from George Washington University in 1976.

Cisneros served as an infantry officer in the Massachusetts Army National Guard while at MIT.

In 1969 Henry Cisneros married his high school sweet heart, Mary Alice Perez. They have two daughters, Teresa and Mercedes, and a son John Paul.

Early career
Cisneros' community-building career began in urban public service, and setting in motion a focus he would maintain through his entire career to present.  The summer after earning his undergraduate degree, he worked in the office of the City Manager of San Antonio.  While earning his master's degree from Texas A&M, Cisneros worked in the office of the City Manager of Bryan, Texas, and later as the assistant director of President Lyndon B. Johnson's Model Cities program for urban revitalization in San Antonio.

After completing his education at A&M in January 1970, Cisneros and his wife moved to Washington, D.C. where he became the assistant to the Executive Vice President of the National League of Cities. In 1971, the year his eldest daughter Teresa Angelica was born, Cisneros was honored as a White House Fellow and served as an assistant to the Secretary of Health, Education, and Welfare, Elliot Richardson.

Upon earning a Ford Foundation Grant in 1972, Cisneros and his young family moved to Boston, where he earned his second master's degree at Harvard. During this time, he worked as a teaching assistant in the Department of Urban Studies and Planning at the Massachusetts Institute of Technology (MIT).

In 1974, after turning down a professorship at MIT, Cisneros chose to return to San Antonio. There, he assumed a teaching faculty position in the Public Administration program at the University of Texas at San Antonio.

Political career beginnings
When Cisneros arrived back home, he discovered the old order, stagnant political arena in San Antonio was falling apart and now experiencing a growing socio-ethnic discontent. Since the 1950s, the Anglo-dominated Good Government League (GGL) had run the city where council members were elected at large and the majority came from wealthy ZIP codes in the Anglo populated north side. The Mexican American community believed they had been neglected for too long by a government who paid more attention to city growth in their own residential area than grievances about drainage and infrastructure in lower-valued real estate.  The GGL tried to offset this by assuring one member from both west and east sides and recruited Hispanics in their slates for city council.  Displaying his gift for working within the system, Cisneros ran as a city council candidate of the GGL.

After a whirlwind campaign, and eight months since returning to San Antonio, Cisneros at age 27 was elected the youngest city councilman in the city's history in 1975, the same year his second daughter Mercedes Christina was born.  (Cisneros was the youngest councilman at the time until Chip Haas' election in 2003 at age 26.)  Now entrenched in city politics, Cisneros assumed a hands-on approach to governing that he promised in his campaign.  He set himself on a plan to know all he could about life in the city firsthand by emptying garbage cans to learn the problems of the sanitation department, walking a beat with a police officer and administering first aid with ambulance attendants. Cisneros also visited families in public housing units, and promised that their problems would no longer be ignored.

As a city council member, Cisneros took assorted populist positions on such issues as dealing with labor, water, education, and housing, among others. All the while, he endeared himself to the Latino community, especially in the city's predominantly Mexican American poor neighborhoods on the west side, and where he resided.

Because of the GGL's continued authority, the city council was still roundly criticized for not being representative.  During the civil-rights furor of the 1960s, the Voting Rights Act signed into law in 1965 required that racial groups be given direct representation by political districts to assure the election of a member. Significantly, in a split vote on the city council on whether to accept a Justice Department order to establish an election plan that would provide more access to the Latino community with direct representation, or challenge the order in court, Cisneros voted to accept the order. San Antonio thus moved to single-member directly represented districts in 1977.  This led to the beginning of the end for the GGL and all efforts to rationalize all-city rule.

Cisneros was re-elected twice more to the city council in 1977 and 1979 as a representative of San Antonio Council District 1.

During his time on the city council, Cisneros formed a relationship with Communities Organized for Public Service (COPS), a powerful grassroots Latino advocacy group founded in 1973 whose focus was to push for development funding into the city's Latino communities.  His attention to the needs for infrastructure to the lower income Mexican American neighborhoods further elevated Cisneros' standing in the Latino community. Yet at the same time, Cisneros also looked forward to building a greater San Antonio and the socially redeeming power that comes with economic growth. As a city councilman from 1975 to 1979, Cisneros had an ability to form a political bridge between the pro-growth business interests and an underrepresented Mexican American community. He "enjoyed the resources and visibility of the GGL establishment without being confined to its agenda," and "built an image of an articulate, smooth, Harvard and MIT educated man." Cisneros also was a local grown home boy who "cared about the problems of the common person."

He served for six years (three terms) on the City Council before being elected Mayor of San Antonio in 1981.

Mayor of San Antonio

Cisneros announced himself as an independent candidate for mayor in 1981.  His campaigning of hopeful visions for the future of the city was able to unite the wealthy conservatives of San Antonio and the increasingly vocal Mexican American community.  On April 4, 1981, Cisneros became, at age 33, the second Hispanic mayor of a major U.S. city, and the first Mexican-American mayor of San Antonio since 1842 when Juan Seguín resigned as mayor.  He was elected with 62 percent of the vote.  At the time of his election, San Antonio was the tenth largest city in the United States.

He was reelected to three more terms as mayor by overwhelming margins, including winning an unprecedented 94.2 percent of the vote in 1983, a 73 percent margin of victory in 1985, and 67 percent in 1987.  His popularity did not rest with San Antonio's Hispanic community alone, but with all ethnic groups in the area. In 1982, he was selected as one of the "Ten Outstanding Young Men of America" by the U.S. Jaycees, in addition to receiving a prestigious Jefferson Award for "Greatest Public Service by an Individual 35 Years or Under."

Cisneros' campaign for mayor and subsequent election gained the attention of national media who made Cisneros the symbol of the growing Latino population in the United States.  According to Richard Garcia, "Cisneros, above all, exemplified the rise of the Mexican American generation and the search for … its identity."  He was positively profiled by such national publications as The Wall Street Journal, Vanity Fair, Esquire and The New Yorker. U.S. News & World Report listed him (along with then-Arkansas Governor Bill Clinton) as one of "Ten Rising Stars of American Politics", and a 60 Minutes profile introduced him to a televised national audience.

In his eight years as mayor of San Antonio, Cisneros attracted national attention for his success in developing new economic growth in the city's business sector, and with his diplomatic skills to 'promote cooperation' among the city's various ethnic groups. He exercised a developmental expansion strategy that led the city to unprecedented levels of economic and cultural growths.  Cisneros brought federal monies to San Antonio that further developed the downtown business district. He courted Fortune 500 companies and technology firms to set up shop locally to create jobs, enlarge the city's reserves with local business taxes, and to cement San Antonio's reputation as a leading city for technology, skilled work and economic output.  His efforts brought additional investments to San Antonio, such as luring SeaWorld and Fiesta Texas, two major theme park tourist attractions.  In his signature accomplishment, Cisneros convinced the city's residents to vote for the city-financed construction of the Alamodome.

Cisneros also paved the way for Pope John Paul II to visit San Antonio during the pontiff's 10-day tour to the United States in September 1987.  More than one million people saw the Pope during his 22-hour visit to San Antonio, more than any other city on that 10-day tour.  Cisneros' mayoral success for elevating San Antonio's reputation and economic base as a leading city in the nation led to Texas Monthly in 1999 naming him its Texas Mayor of the Century.  The publication pointed to such achievements as a downtown riverfront redevelopment that drew tourists from far and wide and contending that he had "changed San Antonio's image from a poor and somewhat sleepy town to a culturally and economically vibrant model for the future of urban America."  During Cisneros' tenure as mayor, San Antonio was named an All American City for 1982–83, a prestigious honor awarded by the National Civic League.

Throughout his mayorship, Cisneros continued to live in the small house that once belonged to his grandfather in the city's west side. He populist positions on issues that favored the poor and the working class. Cisneros also funneled more than $200 million to the city's long neglected Hispanic west side for streets, gutters, libraries, and parks.  His improvements also alleviated that area's long standing flooding and drainage problems.  Cisneros' ties to business also helped him establish an education partnership that brought together the city, the local colleges and universities, local business, and various community organizations. This partnership provided financial aid for college to young people in the poorest school districts of San Antonio.

The national visibility Cisneros gained as mayor of San Antonio led to President Ronald Reagan appointing him in 1983 to the Bipartisan Commission on Central America, chaired by Henry Kissinger. In 1984, Democratic presidential nominee Walter Mondale tapped Cisneros as a finalist for the vice presidential nomination, which eventually went to U.S. Rep. Geraldine Ferraro.  Cisneros was selected to give the highly visible "Platform Presentation" at the Democratic National Convention in San Francisco on July 17, 1984.  His viability as a national leader was confirmed in 1985 when Cisneros was elected president of the National League of Cities.  In 1986, City and State Magazine selected him as the "Outstanding Mayor" in the nation.  A scholarly study of America's mayors, The American Mayor, ranked Cisneros as one of the 15 best mayors in the nation in a period that spanned the 20th century.  He was consistently touted as senatorial and/or gubernatorial material throughout his tenure as mayor, and was identified positively by both conservatives and liberals.  In Señor Alcalde ("Mr. Mayor"), John Gillies wrote: "He tried to avoid a political label, such as Democrat or Republican, because he wanted to consider the needs of all of San Antonio's groupings.... He formed a bridge between conservatives and liberals..."

In 1987, Cisneros announced he would not seek a fifth two-year term as mayor and would leave public life after completing his current term as mayor.  Several factors contributed to his decision.  The same year, his son, John Paul Anthony, named for the pope, was born with congenital asplenia syndrome; instead of the normal four chambers, the heart functioned as if it had only two.  As a result, the blood that cycled through the baby's system was poorly oxygenated and threatened to flood his lungs as the heart grew.  The condition also meant the child was born without a spleen and was 50 times more likely to contract a fatal infectious disease.  Cisneros desired to devote more time with his ailing son, whose doctors had given roughly six years to live and whose life would be filled with major surgeries. When John Paul reached his sixth birthday in 1993, Cisneros told Sophfronia Scott Gregory in Time Magazine of his son's ongoing fight for life: "Nothing in my life has prepared me for this."

Cisneros was one of the lowest paid major city mayors in the country, with a $4,500-per-year stipend, and had supplemented his income by speaking fees and teaching urban affairs and government at Trinity University in the Department of Urban Studies.  Facing huge medical bills, along with two daughters rapidly approaching college age, Cisneros also hoped to make more money in private industry.

In 1989, Cisneros left public office and became chairman of the Cisneros Asset Management Company, a national asset-management investment firm that managed $550 million in fixed-income accounts.  During this period, he hosted Texans, a one-hour television show produced quarterly in Texas, and Adelante, a national daily Spanish-language radio commentary.  He also served as deputy chairman of the Federal Reserve Bank of Dallas, and until he was named Secretary of HUD, he served as a board member of the Rockefeller Foundation, chairman of the National Civic League and chairman of the Advisory Committee on the Construction of San Antonio's Alamodome.  In 1990, citizens urged Cisneros to run for Governor of Texas, but chose to stay close to home to spend as much time as possible with his family. At the time, doctors did not know if surgery could correct John Paul's heart problem.  Cisneros' collaboration with his wife in caring for John Paul — who later recovered to flourish in school after several major surgeries — brought the two back together.  In 1991, VISTA Magazine awarded him with its Hispanic Man of the Year honor.

A 1993 survey of historians, political scientists and urban experts conducted by Melvin G. Holli of the University of Illinois at Chicago saw Cisneros ranked as the twelfth-best American big-city mayor to serve between the years 1820 and 1993. The survey also saw Cisneros ranked the second-best big-city mayor to serve in office post-1960.

Secretary of Housing and Urban Development

As an advisor to Bill Clinton's successful 1992 presidential campaign, Cisneros was mentioned as a possible replacement for various Texas officials who ascended to jobs in the new Democratic administration. He turned down an appointment as a U.S. senator from Texas for the seat formerly held by Lloyd Bentsen, who had been nominated as Secretary of the Treasury.  Clinton nominated him to serve as his new Secretary of Housing and Urban Development (HUD).  He was unanimously confirmed by the U.S. Senate and sworn into office by Chief Justice William Rehnquist on January 22, 1993.  With the appointment, Cisneros instantly became the highest ranking Mexican American official in U.S. politics.  He also pledged to do everything possible to reform the troubled $28 billion department.

Cisneros was praised for his work as HUD Secretary.  Judith Evans reported in The Washington Post that both critics and supporters of Cisneros said he never lacked passion for his job and that he was able to make changes at the margin that made HUD a more effective housing provider. Rep. Rick Lazio (R-NY), chairman of the House subcommittee on housing and community opportunity in 1996 said Cisneros displayed "the correct balance of advocacy on behalf of the president and a willingness to think creatively and outside the box in terms of solutions."  In his 1999 book, Inside Game/Outside Game: Winning Strategies for Saving Urban America, urban policy consultant David Rusk wrote "…in my view, (Cisneros was) the most successful of the ten secretaries of Housing and Urban Development since the cabinet agency was formed in 1965." Clinton said Cisneros was a brilliant public servant, and additionally said that people had no idea how much he contributed to the government.

In his first full week as Secretary, Cisneros was confronted by the unprecedented growing number of homeless in the country's cities, and declared homelessness "a highest priority."  He quickly recommended that an economic stimulus package include $100 million to $150 million for homeless programs that mix housing and social services. Cisneros tapped Andrew Cuomo to serve as an assistant housing secretary, in charge of homelessness. He spent an evening touring a shelter and the streets in Washington D.C.  One night in late December 1994, he walked the streets of Minneapolis and St. Paul, talking to the homeless and later flopped for the night in a shelter in an effort to understand homelessness firsthand.  The next day he announced $7.3 million in HUD for five Minnesota state projects for homeless youth and families.  However, his efforts to alleviate the problem were often thwarted by a slow-moving bureaucracy. He described his frustration to Jill Smolowe in Time: "I can't believe how gridlocked the system is ... how irrelevant it is to things that are happening out in the country."

During his term, Cisneros reformed the public housing system.  With his position, he inherited the massive undertaking to oversee the implementation of the HOPE VI program.  Initially authorized as part of the Housing and Community Development Act of 1992, the HOPE VI program represented a dramatic turnaround in public housing policy and one of the most ambitious urban redevelopment efforts in the nation's history. The program is designed to tear down and redevelop severely distressed public housing projects, occupied by poor families, into redesigned mixed-income housing.  To do this, Section 8 housing vouchers are provided to enable the original residents to rent apartments in the private market.  Bruce Katz, vice president and founding director of the Metropolitan Policy Program at the Brookings Institution, said at a July 14, 2009 event there that HOPE VI is generally considered to be one of the most successful urban regeneration initiatives in the past half century.

As Secretary, Cisneros worked diligently to make the program his own, and said HOPE VI was the last gasp for public housing.  By the end of his term, Cisneros through his agency had renovated 250 of the worst public housing projects, authorized the demolition of 43,000 mostly vacant units, and advocated for demolishing a total of 100,000 units by the year 2000 in major urban cities. HOPE VI was not without controversy, and Cisneros even appeared on Montel Williams' talk show to discuss HUD's plan to raze America's most crime-ridden, dilapidated housing projects and replace them with attractive new homes with modern amenities in mixed-use developments.

During his drive to reform public housing, Cisneros met with many detractors, including housing advocates who at first feared his vision for restructuring the agency's familiar programs would reduce assistance to low-income families and depressed urban centers. Despite alarms raised by critics, Cisneros also supported legislation to give local public housing authorities the flexibility to adjust rents to encourage more working families to stay in public housing and evict drug dealers and other criminals from housing projects.  Near the end of his tenure as Secretary, Cisneros told The Washington Post that he was most proud of his effort to reform public housing, changing the way local officials provide shelter to the country's poor. He long contended the decline of public housing projects resulted from massive concentrations of the nation's poorest of poor. Federal laws punished people for working, significantly raising rents as their wages rose.

In addition to HUD focusing on the poor, Cisneros seized the goal of the Clinton administration to widen homeownership opportunities.  Under his command, HUD advanced a long way in expanding homeownership among the country's most under-represented groups — young adults, minorities and low- to moderate-income families.  When Cisneros arrived at HUD, the home ownership rate was 63.7 percent. When he left office in 1997 it had risen to 65.7 percent, its highest level since 1981.  Under policies set in place by Cisneros' administration, at the end of Clinton's second term, homeownership continued its upward trend to 67.5 percent.  At the close of his term, Cisneros acknowledged that lower interest rates and a strong economy were primary factors for the increase.  However, the agency's ability to convince lenders, builders and real estate agents that there was money to be made in selling housing to low- and moderate-income individuals played a significant role, he said.

As the Clinton administration's top housing official in the mid-1990s, Cisneros loosened mortgage restrictions so first-time buyers could qualify for loans they could never get before, contributing to the great housing and financial crisis that began 10 years later.  However, in the August 5, 2008 issue of The Village Voice, Wayne Barrett argued that Andrew Cuomo made a series of decisions as Secretary of HUD between 1997 and 2001 that helped give birth to the country's current housing credit crisis.

Cisneros successfully resisted efforts to substantially reduce or wholly eliminate the Department.  He spent countless hours during his four-year tenure pleading the agency's case while Congressional appropriators cut its budget. He presented a plan in 1995 to trim the department's budget by $13 billion over five years.  Cisneros told the San Antonio Express-News: "There are efforts under way to eliminate important national efforts which provide shelter and assistance to millions of low-income Americans.  I intend to stay and fight for our nation's commitment to people who need help and to reform HUD... This may be the last opportunity I have to be in public life...I just want to do everything I can to make the biggest difference I can."

Even his critics supported his efforts against budget cuts.  Deborah Austin, director of legislation and policy for the National Low Income Housing Coalition, said in 1996, "For all we may not have liked about Cisneros, he was largely responsible for beating back pressure to eliminate and substantially reduce the department."

As Secretary, Cisneros attacked head on fair housing policies.  "Fair housing," he told Guy Gugliotta of The Washington Post, "is so vital that we cannot accomplish any of the other goals without it."  He unveiled a plan for HUD to provide $70 million in housing vouchers enabling low-income Americans to rent living space in the communities of their choice, an idea that brought Cisneros criticism in affluent circles in his native Texas and elsewhere.  When it came to justice in home loans, Cisneros, through his agency, stood firm to lenders by letting them know that HUD would no longer tolerate unfairly denying minorities access to home loans, and aggressively penalized lenders who broke fair lending laws.  The department also made it easier for alleged victims of fair housing to file complaints. During Cisneros's four-year term, the agency's decisions in favor of victims of housing discrimination resulted in the awarding of a total of $80 million in damages, compared with $13 million in the previous four years. Cisneros greatly eased the bureaucracy to deal with fair housing issues much swifter. "The train started to run on time," with complaints being heard much faster, said John Relman of the Washington Lawyers' Committee for Civil Rights and Urban Affairs. "It's hard to find somebody in that position who could be more supportive of fair housing than Henry Cisneros."

Cisneros took on the unenviable position to completely restructure the HUD bureaucracy.  His ability to make sweeping, innovative changes at HUD was hampered by deep budget cuts and elimination of some programs. The agency's staff had been cut to 10,000 at the end of his term, from 13,500 since he took over. He consolidated offices, moved staff from headquarters to field offices and increased management training. He reduced the number of agency programs from 240 to 20. The most difficult job for Cisneros as part of this reform was changing the attitudes of employees, who were often resistant to improving service to their communities.

Cisneros also took a high-profile role in the cleanup operation after the 1994 Los Angeles earthquake.

Medlar affair

In March 1995, US Attorney General Janet Reno bowed to demands of the new Republican majority in the House of Representatives and secured the appointment of an Independent Counsel, David Barrett to investigate allegations that Cisneros had lied to FBI investigators during background checks prior to being named Secretary of HUD. He had been asked about payments that he had made to former mistress Linda Medlar, also known as Linda Jones. Both were married at the time when Medlar volunteered to work on Cisneros' campaign for Mayor of San Antonio. The affair had been 'public knowledge' for a number of years until Medlar sold the story to Inside Edition for $15,000.  The investigation was based on Cisneros's understating to the FBI the amount of money paid to his former mistress and was continued for 10 years, until in January 2006, when Congress finally refused to continue funding it.

Citing the needs of his family, Cisneros ended his term as Secretary in January 1997.  After the controversy became known during his first term as Secretary, Cisneros offered to submit his resignation to Clinton, who rejected it with a public statement that described Cisneros as "a good man and an effective public servant". Cisneros decided to stay in his position, adding in a statement in the San Antonio Express-News, "I regret any mistakes that I have made but affirm once again that I have at no point violated the public's trust."

He said the decision was largely brought on by the mounting legal costs to defend an investigation by special prosecutor David Barrett into allegations he had lied to the FBI about the size of payments he gave his former mistress, Linda Medlar. Cisneros, who made $148,000 annually in his cabinet position, had tuition bills for a daughter in her third year at New York University law school and another who was a fourth-year student at Stanford, in addition to continued medical care bills for his ailing son. "Really, I came to do this for four years. I prayed I could stretch the finances that far," he said. "This is about as far as I can stretch it."

Medlar had surfaced in 1994 with a breach of contract lawsuit against Cisneros, claiming he had agreed to support her until her daughter's college graduation, but that he had discontinued monthly payments. Cisneros had made payments to her following the end of their affair, discontinuing them only after taking a pay cut upon returning to public life.  Although Cisneros had divulged the payments during the FBI background check preceding his appointment, Medlar's claims suggested that Cisneros might have misrepresented the amount. That led to Attorney General Janet Reno recommending a special prosecutor be appointed to investigate Cisneros in March 1995. In December 1997, Cisneros was indicted on 18 counts of conspiracy, giving false statements and obstruction of justice. In September 1999, Cisneros negotiated a plea agreement, under which he pleaded guilty to a misdemeanor count of lying to the FBI and was fined $10,000. He did not receive jail time or probation.

Medlar used some of the Cisneros money to purchase a house and enter into a bank fraud scheme with her sister and brother-in-law to conceal the source of the money. In January 1998, Medlar pleaded guilty to 28 charges of bank fraud, conspiracy to commit bank fraud and obstruction of justice.

Clinton later pardoned Cisneros in January 2001.

After leaving public office

After leaving HUD in January 1997, Cisneros moved his family to Los Angeles and served from 1997 to 2000 as president and chief operating officer of Univision Communications, the nation's largest Spanish-language broadcaster that had become the fifth-most-watched television network in the nation.  Cisneros currently serves on Univision's Board of Directors.  By 2000, Cisneros and his wife moved back to San Antonio.

Upon returning to San Antonio, Cisneros established a firm to develop affordable housing there, and in other American cities. His commitment was to develop homes affordable to the core of America's workers such as police, nurses, teachers and city workers. "Home ownership is the way people step into the American dream," Cisneros told the San Diego Union-Tribune. " It creates access to the levers of wealth." The company that he formed in 2000 as American City Vista to develop residential areas in the central zones of many of the nation's major metropolitan areas evolved to become CityView.

In November 2015, Cisneros became an equity partner in Siebert Brandford Shank & Co, an investment banking firm, subsequently called Siebert, Cisneros, Shank & Co. L.L.C.

Cisneros' continued active involvement in the real estate industry has led to him receiving multiple national honors.  In 2006, Builder Magazine named Cisneros #18 out of the top 50 most influential people in the real estate industry. In June 2007, Cisneros was inducted into the National Association of Homebuilders (NAHB) "Builders Hall of Fame" and honored by the National Housing Conference as the "Housing Person of the Year."

As a private citizen, Cisneros remains active in non-profit and civic leadership.  He was an advisor for the American Democracy Institute; a trustee for the American Film Institute; and Co-Chair of The National Commission on Fair Housing and Equal Opportunity, to name a few.  Cisneros is currently a board member for the Greater San Antonio Chamber of Commerce, and after-School All-Stars, founded by California Governor Arnold Schwarzenegger, in addition to being a member of the Advisory Boards of the Bill and Melinda Gates Foundation and the Broad Foundation, among others. He also took a role in corporate leadership and has served as a board member for Live Nation, in addition to the boards of major builder KB Home and the largest mortgage lender in the nation at one time, Countrywide Financial — two companies among many that prospered in the housing boom, drawing criticism along the way for abusive business practices.

Cisneros has also been author, editor or collaborator in several books, including Interwoven Destinies:  Cities and the Nation, a project with the late former HUD Secretary Jack Kemp; Opportunity and Progress:  A Bipartisan Platform for National Housing Policy was presented the Common Purpose Award for demonstrating the potential of bipartisan cooperation; and Casa y Comunidad:  Latino Home and Neighborhood Design, a publication that took the first-ever look at the growing and increasingly prosperous U.S. Latino community and its housing needs, was awarded the Benjamin Franklin Silver Medal in the category of best business book of 2006.  His most recent collaboration with the late former HUD Secretary Jack Kemp, Our Communities, Our Homes: Pathways to Housing and Homeownership in America's Cities and States, is a guide for local leaders in designing comprehensive housing policies. In 2018 he co-authored "Building Equitable Cities: How to Drive Economic Mobility and Regional Growth". The book provides real world examples of both place-based and people-based strategies that are being used successfully to provide more equitable outcomes.

Cisneros served as a member of the Debt Reduction Task Force at the Bipartisan Policy Center.

America's cities and housing
From the time he attended a conference on American city issues while in college, during his terms as mayor and HUD secretary, to the present, Cisneros has been driven on a crusade to build America's future by improving its cities' core along with creating affordable housing for the country's workforce families. In his 1993 book, Interwoven Destinies, Cisneros wrote, "The strength of the nation's economy, the contact points for international economics, the health of our democracy, and the vitality of our humanistic endeavors — all are dependent on whether America's cities work."

He is the only former HUD secretary to remain working in housing and urban affairs. 

Cisneros received the 2002 National Inner City Leadership Award from the United States Conference of mayors, honoring him for his work in promoting the revitalization of city economies. It was said of him when receiving the award: "Henry's unwavering dedication to this country's inner city economies is a testament to the difference one person can make." In 2007, Cisneros was honored with the "Housing Person of the Year" Award from the National Housing Conference, where it was said: "Without question Henry Cisneros has demonstrated a lifelong dedication to providing housing to America's working families...." Together with Jack Kemp, he received the Walter F. Mondale and Edward W. Brooke Fair Housing Award in June 2009 from the Fair Housing Alliance.

Cisneros, either in the past or currently, served on several national commissions in urban affairs such as the Partnership for Sustainable Communities Leadership Advisory Council, and the boards of the National Smart Growth Council and the National Alliance to End Homelessness.  He presently serves as a member of the Technical Advisory Committee for the recovery effort in New Orleans and as Co-Chair of the National Commission on Fair Housing and Equal Opportunity.

San Antonio
Cisneros grew up in a middle class family in San Antonio. He and his wife now live in the small house that once belonged to his grandfather in the predominantly Latino inner west side. As mayor, one of his accomplishments was the designation of funds to the west side neighborhoods for capital improvements.

After returning home to San Antonio in 2000, Cisneros and his wife founded the non-profit American Sunrise in 2001 to provide services for their neighbors within one square mile. From an after school learning center for children to adult literacy classes, American Sunrise creates communities where working families find can find economic, educational and housing opportunities to improve the standard of living in the neighborhood. Annually, 8–10 dilapidated homes are purchased, refurbished and sold back at very affordable costs to create more homeownership opportunities in poor central city neighborhoods.  Cisneros' wife Mary Alice Cisneros held his former seat on the City Council from 2007-2011.

Cisneros remains active in San Antonio's leadership where he is Chairman of BioMed S.A., an effort to accelerate the city's health care and biosciences sector, on the board of the Greater San Antonio Chamber of Commerce, and is the incoming chair of the city's economic development council.

Latino affairs

Cisneros is the co-creator of the National Hispanic Leadership Agenda, a group that comes together on a quadrennial basis to present a platform on the major issues facing the Latino community, and the nation as a whole.  Additionally, Cisneros is a co-founder of the New American Alliance, a national organization united to promote the economic advancement of the American Latino community.

Cisneros has spoken to every major Latino group across the US and has served on the boards of numerous Latino organizations. He has also been honored with many awards and recognitions for his involvement and commitment to Latino issues.  In 2007, Cisneros received the prestigious Maestro Award for Leadership, at the Latino Leaders Summit, hosted by Latino Leaders magazine. In selecting Cisneros for the honor, Jorge Ferraez, publisher of Latino Leaders magazine stated: "Henry Cisneros has demonstrated a life-long dedication to public service and improving the life of Latinos.  At a time when the Latino community is prospering, we are pleased to honor Cisneros as a leader who has spent decades paving the way for Latino success in education, housing, and business."

The Latino population is estimated to grow to 63 million and make up 25 percent of the U.S. population by 2050, according to U.S. Census Bureau estimates. With that on the horizon, Cisneros says the global competitiveness of the United States hinges on the progress of the country's Hispanic population, the fastest-growing minority group.

"The Latino population is growing so rapidly that American progress in the coming century is inextricably linked to the progress of the Latino community," Cisneros said. "Any investment in services that help lift Latinos into the middle class is an investment in the future of the entire country."

Cisneros said Hispanic immigrants must invest in American society by mastering English, putting their children through school, buying homes, providing their families with health care, and participating enthusiastically in civic, community and religious activities. In 2009, he created the nonprofit group, Our Pledge, to help immigrants integrate into American society by improving language skills and expanding their participation in military service and civic activities.

Honors and awards
Cisneros has received multiple honors and awards.
One of "Five Outstanding Young Texans" Texas Jaycees, 1976
One of "Ten Outstanding Young Men of America" U.S. Jaycees, 1982
Torch of Liberty Award, Anti-Defamation League of B'nai B'rith, 1982
Jefferson Award, American Institute of Public Service, 1982
Award for Contribution to American Cities and Politics, Harvard Foundation, 1985
President's Medal of Merit, Pan American University, 1985
Distinguished Leadership Award, American Institute of Planners, 1985
National Recognition Award by the Mexican Government for 1985 Earthquake Assistance
Honorary member, American Institute of Architects, 1986
Outstanding Mayor "All-Pro City Management Team," City & State magazine (now Governing), September 1986
Distinguished Service Award, Baylor College of Medicine, 1986
Leadership in Local Government Award, American City & County magazine, 1987
President's Award, National League of Cities, 1989
Hispanic Man of the Year, VISTA Magazine, 1991
Founder Award, Partners for Livable Communities, 1992
MSC Student Conference on National Affairs Keynote Speaker, 1992
Boys and Girls Clubs of America's Fourth Annual Legends and Fans Award, 1993
Hubert H. Humphrey Civil Rights Award, Leadership Conference on Civil Rights, 1994
Hero of the People Award, ACORN, 1994
Family Housing Legacy Award, Los Angeles Family Housing, 2000
Humanitarian Award, Los Angeles Inner City Law Center, 2001
Lifetime Achievement Award, Para Los Niños, 2001
Theodor Herzl Award, Municipality of Jerusalem & The Jerusalem Fund of Aish HaTorah, 2001
Environmental Hero Award for Business, California League of Conservation Voters, 2001
Hammer of Hope Award, Habitat for Humanity of Orange County, CA, 2002
Hadassah Award, San Antonio Chapter, 2002
National Inner City Leadership Award, Initiative for a Competitive Inner City, April 2002
Congressional Hispanic Caucus Institute Medallion of Excellence for Leadership, 2002
Torah Learning Center (TLC) Moreshet Heritage Award, 2003
Aguila Azteca, Government of the Republic of Mexico, 2003
Catherine Powell Distinguished Service Award, Texas City Planners Association, 2004
Builder of the Year, El Nuevo Constructor Magazine, 2004
James W. Rouse Civic Medal of Honor, Enterprise Community Partners, 2004
Israel Bonds Leadership Award, 2004
Martin Luther King, Jr. Distinguished Achievement Award, San Antonio Martin Luther King, Jr. Commission, 2005
Civil Rights Award, NEWSED Community Development Corporation, 2005
Excellence in Affordable Housing Initiatives, City of San Antonio, 2005
Trinity Prize for Innovative Urban Governance, Mayor of San Antonio 1981–1989, 2005
Common Ground Award for Bipartisan Cooperation (shared with Jack Kemp), Search for Common Ground, March 2005
Top 101 "Top Leaders of the Hispanic Community," Latino Leaders Magazine, 2006
Business Man of the Year, Texas Association of Mexican-American Chambers of Commerce, July 2006
Lifetime Achievement Award, San Antonio Hispanic Chamber of Commerce, July 2006
Top 50 "Most Influential People in Home Building," Builder Magazine, December 2006
Cesar Chavez Award, American Association for Affirmative Action, 2007
National Hispanic Hero Award, United States Hispanic Leadership Institute, 2007
Housing Person of the Year, National Housing Conference, June 2007
Inductee, Builders Hall of Fame, National Association of Home Builders, June 2007
President's Award, National Council of La Raza, July 2007
Maestro Award for Leadership, Latino Leaders magazine, August 2007
Housing Leadership Award, National Low Income Housing Coalition, February 2008
Visionary Award, Hispanic College Fund, May 2008
National Leadership Honoree, Hispanic Elected Local Officials, June 2008
Hubert H. Humphrey Award, The American Political Science Association, August 2008
Visionary Award, Habitat for Humanity Los Angeles, October 2008
Walter F. Mondale and Edward W. Brooke Fair Housing Award, National Fair Housing Alliance, June 2009

In addition, Cisneros is the recipient of numerous honorary degrees. Most recently, an Honorary Doctor of Laws from Occidental College in Los Angeles in 2000.

Books, writings and speeches
Cisneros has a significant history of authoring, co-authoring, editing and contributing to several books and publications, along with speaking, narration and television appearances.
"A Survival Strategy for America's Cities", Richard S. Childs Lecture in Municipal Administration, The City Club of New York, 1982
"San Antonio's Place in the Technology Economy; A Review of Opportunities and a Blueprint for Action", 1982
"Target 1990; Goals and Decisions for San Antonio's Future," authored as Mayor, 1983
Samuel Rubin Lecture, Samuel Rubin Program for the Advancement of Liberty and Equality through Law, Columbia Law School, February 24, 1986
Chubb Fellowship (lecture), Timothy Dwight College, Yale University, 1986
Daily Radio Commentary, 40 radio stations, produced by Tichenor Broadcasting, 1989–1992
Tomás Rivera Lecture, American Association of Hispanics in Higher Education, 1992
"Interwoven Destinies: Cities and the Nation", (W. W. Norton & Company NY, 1993), Editor, The American Assembly
"Urban America: HUD's call to action", Urban Land magazine (ISSN 0042-0891, v.53, n.1, pp. 22–24, January 1994)
"Comic Relief VI", (national broadcast HBO, January 15, 1994) cast member
"Earth Angels: Migrant Children in America", (Pomegranate 1994), Introduction, Nancy Buirski (Photographer), Ruben Blades (Afterword)
"Legacy for a Reinvented HUD: Charting a New Course in Changing and Demanding Times", Cityscape journal of policy development and research, (Volume 1, Number 3, U.S. Department of Housing and Urban Development, September 1995)
"Secretary's Essay Series, (9 essays)" (U.S. Department of Housing and Urban Development, 1995–1996)
"University and the Urban Challenge ", first in a series, January 1995
"Defensible Space: Deterring Crime and Building Community ", second in a series, January 1995
"Regionalism: The New Geography of Opportunity", third in a series, March 1995
"Urban Entrepreneurialism and National Economic Growth", fourth in a series, September 1995
"Higher Ground: Faith Communities and Community Building", fifth in a series, February 1996
"Preserving Everybody's History ", sixth in a series, February 1996
"Fathers and Families: Changing the Rules", seventh in a series, December 1996
"Urban Land and the Urban Prospect", eighth in a series, December 1996
"Community Colleges and Urban Development", ninth in a series, December 1996
"Chicano! History of the Mexican-American Civil Rights Movement", (national broadcast PBS, April 1996) narrator, by Hector Galán: Producer
"Report on the state of America's communities", delivered to the National Press Club, Washington, D.C., April 25, 1996
"The Mexican American Family Album (The American Family Albums)", (Oxford University Press, 1998) by Dorothy Hooble and Thomas Hoobler, Introduction
"The Millennial City: Classic Readings on U.S. Urban Policy", (Elsevier 1999) From series: Research in Urban Policy v. 12,  edited by R.D. Norton
"The Forgotten Americans", (national broadcast PBS, December 2000) narrator, by Hector Galán: Writer, Producer, Director
"Where Will The Poor Live? Housing Policy and the Location of Low-Income Households", webcast (Richard and Rhoda Goldman School of Public Policy, UC Berkeley, February 7, 2003)
"Homes for Americans in the 21st Century: Challenges and Opportunities for the Nation", Fifth Annual John T. Dunlop Lecture, Joint Center for Housing Studies of Harvard University, September 29, 2003
"Conversations", (KLRN Public Television, San Antonio) host, 2003 – present
"Cinco de Mayo", (national broadcast History Channel, October 2004) narrator, by Hector Galán: Producer, Director
"Promise and Betrayal: Universities and the Battle for Sustainable Urban Neighborhoods", (SUNY Press, 2005) by John I. Gilderbloom and R.L. Mullins Jr., foreword
"Opportunity and Progress: A Bipartisan Platform for National Housing Policy", (Joint Center for Housing Studies, 2005, no ISBN) with Jack Kemp, Kent W. Colton, and Nicolas P. Retsinas
"The Future of the American City", Fourth Annual James W. Rouse Lecture, webcast, September 25, 2005
"About Children:  An Authoritative Resource on the State of Childhood Today", (American Academy of Pediatrics, 2005), by Arthur G. Cosby PhD, Robert E. Greenberg MD, Linda Hill Southward PhD, and Michael Weitzman MD, contributor Ch. 8
"Casa y Comunidad:  Latino Home and Neighborhood Design", (BuilderBooks.com, 2006) with John Rosales
"Our Communities, Our Homes: Pathways to Housing and Homeownership in America's Cities and States", (Joint Center for Housing Studies, 2007) with Jack Kemp, Kent W. Colton, and Nicolas P. Retsinas
"Latinos and the Nations Future", (Arte Público Press, 2008), Editor
"From Despair to Hope: HOPE VI and the Transformation of America's Public Housing", (Brookings Institution Press, 2009), Editor
"Getting The Nation's Housing Sector Back on Track", article (National League of Cities, January 2009)
"A Fence Can't Stop the Future", essay (Newsweek magazine, January 17, 2009)

Affiliations
Throughout his career, Cisneros has been and continues to be associated with numerous business, corporate, housing trade, civic and governmental, educational, and charitable organizations.
Chairman, San Antonio Fire and Police Pension Fund, 1981–1989
Member, President's National Bipartisan Commission on Central America, 1983–1984
Fellow, National Academy of Public Administration, 1984 – present
Visiting Fellow, Harvard University, 1985
President, Texas Municipal League, 1985
Co-Chair, Texas Response to the 1985 Mexico Earthquake, 1985
Member, Board of Regents, Texas A&M University, 1985–1987
Trustee, Notre Dame University, 1985–1988
Member, Council on Foreign Relations, New York, 1985–1993
President, National League of Cities, 1986
Member, Bilateral Commission on the Future of United States–Mexican Relations, Ford Foundation, 1986–1989
Member, Board of Trustees, Baylor College of Medicine, 1987–1990
Member, Governor's (TX) Task Force on Education Finance in Texas, 1989
Chairman, San Antonio Education Partnership, 1989–1992
Chairman, Stadium Advisory Committee, Alamodome, 1989–1992
Member, The Rockefeller Foundation, 1989–1992
Chair, Board of Trustees, The Tomás Rivera Policy Institute, Claremont Graduate University, California 1989–1992
Member, Inter-American Dialogue, 1989–1993
Board Member, National Endowment for Democracy, 1990
Member, Commission on America in the New World, Carnegie Endowment for International Peace, 1990
Member, Governor's (TX) Task Force on Revenues, 1991
Deputy Chairman, Federal Reserve Bank of Dallas, 1991–1992
Board Member, Lyndon B. Johnson Foundation, 1991–1992
Board Member, The American Assembly, 1991–1992
President Clinton Transition Committees, 1992–1993 and 1996–1997
Speaker, MSC Student Conference on National Affairs
Vice-Chairman, President Clinton's Summit for America's Future (Summit on Volunteerism), 1997
Co-Founder, New America Alliance, 1999
Chairman, Rand Corporation Sub-Committee on Urban Education, 2000
Member, Board of Directors, KB Home, 2000–2003
Board Member, Countrywide Financial Corporation, 2000–2007
Board Member, Greater San Antonio Chamber of Commerce, 2000 – present
Member, Development Committee, University of Texas at San Antonio, 2000 – present
Member, Fannie Mae National Advisory Council, 2001
Chairman, Every Texan Foundation, 2001
Trustee, American Film Institute, 2001
Chairman, San Antonio Hispanic Chamber of Commerce, 2001–2003
Senior Advisor and Board Member, Enterprise Community Investment, 2001 – present
Board Member, Institute for a Competitive Inner City, 2002
Member, Advisory Committee, Harvard University, School of Education, 2002–2004
Member, Board of Visitors, Claremont Graduate University, 2002–2005
Member, Advisory Committee, UCLA School of Public Policy, 2002–2006
Chairman and Co-Founder, American Sunrise Communities, 2002 – present
Board Member, Cancer Therapy & Research Center at The University of Texas Health Science Center, San Antonio, 2002 – present
Investor, Ventana Communities, 2003–2007
Jury Member, The Broad Prize for Urban Education, 2003 – present
Vice Chairman, Executive Committee, San Antonio Economic Development Foundation, 2003 – present
Board Member, Avanzar Interior Technologies, Joint Venture with Johnson Controls, 2003 – present
Board Member, The Broad Foundation, 2004 – present
Board Member, After-School All-Stars, 2004 – present
Board Member, Merage Foundation for the American Dream, 2004 – present
Board Member, New Democratic Network, 2004 – present
Board Member, National Alliance to End Homelessness, 2004 – present
Member, Freddie Mac Blue Ribbon Advisory Committee, 2005
Board Member, National Smart Growth Council, 2005 – present
Chairman, BioMed SA, 2005 – present
Member, Homes for Working Families, 2005 – present
Board Member, National Children's Health Forum, 2005 – present
Board Member, Live Nation, 2005–2007
Advisory Board Member, The Raul Yzaguirre Policy Institute, 2006 – present
Advisory Board Member, TMC (Teaching & Mentoring Communities), formerly Texas Migrant Council, 2006 – present
Board Member, Capital One Community Renewal Fund, 2007
Trustee, Strong American Schools, 2007
Advisory Board Member, UCLA School of Public Affairs, 2007
Chairman, Technical Advisory Committee, Office of Recovery Development and Administration, New Orleans, 2007 – present
Chairman, Our Pledge, 2007 – present
Member, Board of Councilors, University of Southern California, School of Policy, Planning, and Development, 2007 – present
Board Member, Univision, 2007 – present
Advisory Board Member, United States Program Advisory Panel, Bill & Melinda Gates Foundation, 2007 – present
Co-Chair, The National Commission on Fair Housing and Equal Opportunity, 2008
Member, Leadership Advisory Council, Partnership for Sustainable Communities, 2009
Advisory Board Chairman, The National Hispanic University 2012–present
Founder, The Cisneros Center for New Americans, 2014–present

See also

 List of people pardoned or granted clemency by the president of the United States

References

External links

CityView homepage
Biography
Collection of articles from the Washington Post about the Cisneros investigation
Office of Independent Counsel David Barret
NY Times Article
Interview with Henry Cisneros, August 12, 1997, University of Texas at San Antonio: Institute of Texan Cultures: Oral History Collection, UA 15.01, University of Texas at San Antonio Libraries Special Collections.

|-

|-

1947 births
20th-century American politicians
American chief operating officers
American politicians of Mexican descent
Central Catholic Marianist High School alumni
Clinton administration cabinet members
Trachtenberg School of Public Policy & Public Administration alumni
Hispanic and Latino American mayors in Texas
Hispanic and Latino American members of the Cabinet of the United States
Harvard Kennedy School alumni
Living people
Mayors of San Antonio
People from San Antonio
Recipients of American presidential pardons
Texas A&M University alumni
Texas Democrats
Texas politicians convicted of crimes
Urban Institute people
Tejano politicians